Susan Elizabeth Fuhrmann (born 30 July 1986), known as "the Fuhrmannator", is an Australian retired international netball player.

Early life
Susan Fuhrmann was born and raised in Katoomba, New South Wales until her parents moved to Perth when she was five-years old. She was an Australian Institute of Sport scholarship holder. Fuhrmann debuted for the Australian national team in 2006, and was also a member of the Australian team that won silver at the 2006 Commonwealth Games and gold at the 2011 Netball World Championships. She used her height advantage to intimidate her opponents, especially Irene van Dyk, New Zealand's top shooter.

ANZ Championship
She previously played for Perth Orioles (2007) and the AIS Canberra Darters (2004–06) in the Commonwealth Bank Trophy.

Australian Netball Diamonds
Fuhrmann made 33 appearances for the Australian Netball Diamonds (the national team), her last appearance being at the end of the 2011 season and she was not selected for the squad for the 2012 season. On 2 February 2013 Fuhrmann announced her retirement from netball.

References

1986 births
Living people
Commonwealth Games silver medallists for Australia
Netball players at the 2006 Commonwealth Games
Netball players at the 2010 Commonwealth Games
West Coast Fever players
ANZ Championship players
AIS Canberra Darters players
Commonwealth Games medallists in netball
Australia international netball players
Perth Orioles players
Netball players from New South Wales
West Australian Netball League players
Australia international Fast5 players
2011 World Netball Championships players
Medallists at the 2006 Commonwealth Games
Medallists at the 2010 Commonwealth Games